Yaya and Angelina: The Spoiled Brat Movie  is a 2009 Filipino comedy film directed by Michael Tuviera. The film stars Michael V. and Ogie Alcasid as the respective title roles. The film serves as a theatrical film spinoff of Bubble Gang'''s sketch "Ang Spoiled". The movie was produced by GMA Pictures.

Plot
Angelina is a seven-year-old brilliant and talented girl, but with an undeniably spoiled personality. After her first yaya (nanny) gets hospitalized because of her disobedience (A fire occurred prior to her hospitalization; Angelina was the cause of the fire because the nanny was teaching the latter how to grill), her parents decide to find her another yaya who would combat her behavior, and a lot of applicants quit the job due to Angelina's attitude.

Then a woman named Rosalinda "Yaya" Lucero applies for the job, and is accepted. She assumes the job of looking after Angelina as an easy task, to which the latter proves otherwise. Shortly thereafter, some incidents occur:
putting a can of beer in a microwave oven and causing an explosion at the supermarket,
fighting with her classmate in a zoo, and
going up to a belltower to disrupt the wedding that her family attends therein.

Angelina's mom decides to fire Rosalinda if she causes any more problems. Rosalinda is frustrated upon learning this, to which Angelina tries to make her happy. Then she got fired after (accidentally) killing her father's pet fish and because her parents conclude a nanny cannot help their daughter, Angelina lives momentarily without one. With no one to protect her, Angelina is accidentally kidnapped by a group of terrorists after overhearing their plan to murder the Duchess of Wellington, who has arrived from England to visit Angelina's school. After receiving no response from her busy parents, Angelina calls Rosalinda. Angelina describes a place near a warehouse (she sees the words LOSER, which is really part of a sign which reads ManoLO SERvice Center). Doubting Angelina's words, Rosalinda discharges her call. Later on, Rosalinda is convinced to help Angelina in order to prove the latter's sincerity. She goes to the church nearby, where she remembers the bell ringing while Angelina was calling. There she sees the word LOSER, which pertains to Manolo Service Center. She realizes at once that the terrorists' hideout is near. At the warehouse, she finds Angelina, and saves her. Meanwhile, Angelina's parents assume that Rosalinda kidnapped Angelina as revenge for firing her, which is eventually negated.

After Angelina's narrow escape, the terrorists' leader, Eve, kidnaps her parents. The only way to save them is to have Angelina give a bomb-ridden bouquet of flowers to the Duchess of Wellington as she makes her speech. Rosalinda manages to avert the incoming crisis by switching it with another set of flowers. Upon getting the bomb-ridden flower, Rosalinda arrives inside Eve's bus and starts a cat fight with her. Seeing that her plan has been foiled, Eve takes Angelina captive. Rosalinda tracks them down until she reaches the rooftop. She engages Eve once again to a catfight, but as the two women fight each other, the billboard behind them crashes down, trampling Eve but miraculously leaves Rosalinda and Angelina unscathed.

Only Eve (and the terrorists) can fall down, and Angelina's parents decide to reinstate Rosalinda as Angelina's permanent nanny. The Duchess' plows on with her speech and awards Angelina and Rosalinda for their bravery. Near the end of the film, Rosalinda's backside is written with the word "LOSER", and Angelina's is drawn with wings.

Cast and characters
 Michael V. as:
Rosalinda "Yaya" Lucero – the titular character; surname is a pun on Angelina's famous catchphrase, "Whatever yaya, you're such a loser!".

 Ogie Alcasid as: 
Angelina – titular character; name comes from the word "angel" (which is opposite Angelina's personality).

 Aiko Melendez as Mommy
 Jomari Yllana as Daddy
 Iza Calzado as Eve the Boss
 Leo Martinez as Principal Tiongco (called by Angelina as Prince Epal (translated as "Prince Jerk"))
 Roxanne Guinoo as Miss Cruz
 Sheena Halili as May Dakono (a pun on the phrase "Maid ako 'no." (translated as "I'm a maid, you know"))
 Jojo Alejar as Sargeant Sarge
 Victor Aliwalas as Isko Driver (a pun on "screwdriver")
 Pekto as Bernard
 John Feir as Rey
 Julian Trono as Daniel
 Sabrina Man as Tanya

Cameos
 Dennis Trillo as Yaya's neighbor 
 Regine Velasquez as Angelina's first nanny
 Jojit Lorenzo as a supermarket chef 
 Daiana Menezes as a foreign nanny
 Tess Bomb as a Chinese nanny
 Antonette Garcia as Angelina's other nanny

Home video releaseYaya and Angelina was released was released on DVD and VCD by Regal Home Video, the only special feature being the full-length trailer for the movie.

Casting
Francine Prieto and Antonio Aquitania portrayed Mommy and Daddy in the segment of Bubble Gang: Ang Spoiled but was replaced in the movie by Aiko Melendez, former Bubble Gang'' cast member, and Jomari Yllana respectively.

References

External links
 

GMA Pictures films
APT Entertainment films
2009 films
2009 comedy films
Films about nannies
Films based on television series
Films about terrorism in Asia
Films about kidnapping
Philippine comedy films
Films directed by Mike Tuviera